The 1907–08 İstanbul Football League season was the fourth season of the league. Moda FC won the league for the first time.

Season

Istanbul Football League seasons
Istanbul
Istanbul